Boogaloo is a freestyle, improvisational street dance movement of soulful steps and robotic movements which make up the foundations of popping dance and turfing; boogaloo can incorporate illusions, restriction of muscles, stops, robot and/or wiggling. The style also incorporates foundational popping techniques, which were initially referred to as "Posing Hard".  It is related to the later electric boogaloo dance.

Social dance

Chicago Record Hops 
The Boogaloo was initially a social dance within the African American community in Chicago that had crossover appeal to white teenagers. Between 1965 and 1966, it was described as "a total new look compared to previous (social) dances...the entire body moved in a pulsating motion from side to side. The rhythmic impulse seemed to have centered in the upper torso, shoulders, and head". The boogaloo dance craze would inspire a number of soul dance records such as "Boo-Ga-Loo" by Robert "Tom" Tharpe and Jerry "Jerrio" Murray, as well as Fantastic Johnny-C's "Boogaloo Down Broadway". Tharpe got the idea of releasing "Boo-Ga-Loo" by seeing local African American teenagers dancing the Boogaloo at a local record hop hosted by the legendary Chicago Radio DJ Herb "Cool Gent" Kent.

The Boogaloo dance step is also described as a "single-step combination made up of a smooth repetitive side-to-side movement, based on the soul music dance beat on a 4/4 time signature, it consists of lunging motion to the side on the downbeat, held for two counts..accented by a distinct arm swing where the hand is raised up to eye level...then combined with a distinctive backward head-nod to the beat...on the third musical beat, the body and head abruptly shift back and lunge in the opposite direction, before shifting once again on the fourth beat."

James Brown 
In 1966, soul & funk musician James Brown released a boogaloo dance single, "James Brown's Boogaloo" and danced his interpretation of the boogaloo on Where the Action Is on national TV.

The Soul Dance Era (1960s)

The Italian (also known as the Ditalian)
In 1966, Larry Thompson, a local dancer in Oakland, California, put together a boogaloo style inspired by the Boogaloo social dance, James Brown, the Temptations, and Fred Astaire. Through these influences, Thompson would innovate a local boogaloo style and formed a dance group Pirate and the Easy Walkers, together with Cornell "Tony Rome" Reese, Wayne "Freddy Snow" Dillard and Levi Warner. Thompson would also be inspired by watching a dancer from The Hy-Lit Show, a Black and Puerto Rican dancer named Harold (Harold Hazzard): "The move this guy did on the show was a Boogaloo style step with flailing arm moves that would cross the body then end in a freeze with the chest sticking out. This was a good step because we could use it to go into the Camel Walk and into the Skate."

Through 1967 to 1968, soul dancers in Sobrante Park in Oakland, California, would challenge Pirate and the Easy Walkers through "face off's". The Easy Walkers were unique because they mixed different steps of social dances together in a uniform boogaloo style and would innovate challenge steps called the "Ditalian" where dancers would shuffle a combination of cha-cha steps, a stomp and end with a right hand to point and challenge another dancer. The Ditalian was created by Danny Boy Reese, who was the younger brother of Easy Walker's member Cornell Reese.

3-D - Dinosaur - Animation

In 1967, 1968, & 1969, a style  known as 3-D, Dinosaurin' or Animating developed. Dancers such as Albert "Iron Man" Milton, Michael "The Mad" Enoch and Jerry "The Worm" Rentie  as the group, One Plus One imitated Ray Harryhausen stop-motion DynoRama animation movies and incorporated these movements as slap-stick crowd entertainment. Iron Man particularly took influence from 20 Million Miles to Earth reenacting the dinosaur-like creature birthed in the movie and would dance to James Brown. A second generation in the 1970s innovated this style with less comical approach to animated movements and focused on intricate detailed dinosaur movement: this was complete with sudden, full stopping in motion techniques called "dime-stops", minute stop-motion affects and posing; dancers from the group, Soulful Movements - such as Ted Williams, Steve Williams & Tony Newsome were masters at this Boogaloo animated style.

The Robot

In 1964, a Boogaloo dancer named John Murphy imitated Robotic movements influenced by the robot in the 1954 sci-fi movie Tobor the Great, he would move from West Oakland to East Oakland and introduce The Robot in various school talent shows; he is credited with introducing Robot techniques to the Boogaloo community influencing and teaching popular dancers such as Derrick Lovings of Derrick & Company, Newberry, Boogaloo Dan, and the Robotroids. In 1972, John Murphy would help form the Boogaloo dance group The Black Messengers and develop robotic boogaloo.

Funk dance movement (1970s)

High School Mascots: Pantomiming in Character 
Throughout every highschool in Oakland - Castlemont, McClymonds, Fremont - schools would host dance competitions to select their high school mascots. While in costume, every mascot was innovating in-character steps and developed "hitting" techniques to be noticed in large rallies. For example, Donald "Duck" Mathews was the Fremont High School's Tiger mascot, during half-time football shows, he would grab his tail, point and pose to taunt the opponents' mascot and innovated wiggling or worming movements with his chest. Mascots such competed in costume such as Fremont Tigers, Castlemont Knights, Oakland Technical Bulldogs. Competing high schools would have a dance off of Mascots during Basketball and Football games. Duck from Fremont High School is a notable mascot and boogaloo dancer who innovated worming, wiggling and posing while taunting school opponents in a Tiger uniform and character, Fremont High would be known to popularize the "Oakland Hit", allowing his head piece to shake during each hit that inspired similar vibrating Boogaloo hat effects. Other innovative dancers in this era are Gregory Holm from Castlemont High, Henry Fischer, Lil Willie, Larry Robertson and John Murphy at Fremont High, and Ronald Nerves at Oakland Technical High School.

Cartoon Influence & Beginnings of Posing 
In 1967, Jerry Rentie while living in Oakland, would innovate soul boogaloo styles with new funk movements inspired by "mimicking toys, cartoons, movies...everywere we would cut a step (e.g. creating a step). "We took the Ditallion from soft and sliding to a step with a stomp, a bounce, a hop and a skip." Rentie would also innovate the concept of "the Freeze", he explains, "The Freeze was a part of a step where as in doing it you would stop and that pause was to lead into or accent the next movement. Lock It Down was how we called freezing so hard to the point that we would jiggle when we would freeze." The Freeze would be a predecessor to the "Popping" or "Hitting" techniques in the late 70s. Rentie referred to their new Boogaloo style as "Bug'n", Rentie recalls "when we were Bug'n we meant Boogaloo in the term of our dance style but it was clearly not the James Brown Boogaloo anymore."

Posing Hard & Hitting 

In the early 1970s dancers from the Black Messengers group innovated a Boogaloo technique of "Posing Hard": they would end their boogaloo poses and dime-stops with a hard "hit" - to the point of vibrating their muscles; this technique would influence the modern day "popping" technique within the Popping dance form. Since Boogaloo dancers would dance to the changing sounds of funk, Posing Hard matched the rhythm and intensity of the beat with their body's vibrations, chanting "BAM!" or "BOOM!" with each pose.

Oakland Talent Shows & Group Routines 

Through various U.S. Federal funding for community development, Oakland had several community development districts especially in East Oakland and West Oakland, these districts hosted talent shows where Boogaloo dancers would showcase routines alongside live bands and singers. Throughout the 1960 and 1970s, Oakland had numerous teenage funk bands that created the musical landscape for Boogaloo dancers with some Boogaloo groups having their own band to perform with; East Oakland often had three to four bands in every block.

Black Power Movement 

Taking place throughout the late 1960s and early 1970s, Oakland was the center of the Black Power Movement which involved the creation of the Black Panther Party. Boogaloo dance groups such as the Black Resurgents performed for Black Panther community rallies and events. With the advent of the liberation spirit of funk music and Black Power, Boogaloo group names such as The Black Messengers, The Black Resurgents, Black Mechanics, and Black Operators would signify Black pride and self-determination.

In East Oakland, in order to outreach to militant youth, the Allen Temple Baptist Church created a partnership with the Black Panthers to host various social programs at the Temple church hall, the Black Panthers would host Oakland socials that featured Boogaloo dancers such as the Black Messengers.

The Temple (Oakland Community School)

Another central venue for local Boogaloo dancers was the Oakland Community School (OCS) or the "Temple", the Black Panthers had operated this school as part of their community "survival programs". As local Nation of Islam members hosted services on the weekends, this venue was known as "the Temple" and hosted numerous talent shows that featured groups such as the Black Messengers, funk bands and singers. As part of the Black Panthers' curriculum, the venue's principle was “We serve the people everyday. We serve the people, body and soul.” Directed by Ericka Huggins and Donna Howell, OCS provided youth with a culturally relevant education and challenged the public school system’s perceptions of what it meant to be Black and poor.

Notable Boogaloo dance groups 
Boogaloo dance groups incorporated various formations with different styles, here is a working compiled list of active Boogaloo dance groups during the 1960s and 1970s.

1966 to 1969 era
 Pirate & the Easy Walkers 
 One Plus One
 The Five Clowns

1970 to 1975 era
 Continental Five
 Aces of Soul
 Mystic Robots
 The Black Messengers (Also known as "Mechanical Device")
 Soulful Movements
 The Black Resurgents
 Exotic Movements
 Electronical 4
 SS Enterprise
 The Robotroids (Later "Granny & Robotroid Inc")

1976 to 1980s era

 Derrick & Company
 Gentlemen of Production
 The Black Mechanics

1976 to 1980s groups outside of Oakland (Boogaloo influenced from Oakland foundations)

Richmond
 Green Machine 
 Saturn 5 
 Black Operators

San Francisco
 Granny & the Robotroids 
 Black Velvet
 Live Inc

Sacramento
 Soul Sisters Incorporated 
 The Emergens 
 The Prime Ministers 
 Phase II 
 Disco Derby Dancers

Fresno
 Ace Tre Lockers 
 Electronic Boogaloo Lockers (Later Electric Boogaloos)

San Diego
 Scooby Brothers 
 Scott Brothers 
 Sunshine Lockers

Los Angeles
 Fantastic Four

Moves

Soul Boogaloo (Early Funk Boogaloo movements)
 The Italian aka. The Ditallion
 The Harold (Later Swinging Arms)
 Cha-cha-cha (3-step, 2-step)
 Fancy Feet
 The Swoop
 Swinging / Throwin' the Arms
 Wigglin' / Wormin'
 Side to Side (Footwork)
 Hops

Robot Boogaloo
 Breakdown / Break-up
 Chinese Robot
 Posin'
 Hittin / BAM
 The Slot
 The Baby Doll

Animated Boogaloo

 Dynorama / Dinosaurin'
 Vibratin / Tremblin
 3-D / Tickin
 The Moonwalk
 Puppet
 Old Man / Old Man Rudy
 The Medusa
 The Stedford
 The Million-Dollar Man
 The Lean
 Levitating
 Backslide
 Looney Cartoony

Posing

 Creepin
 3-D
 The Bounce
 Dime-stopping
 Posing Hard
 Falling Man
 Broken Man
 Stopping-in-the Air

Group Movement Techniques & Traditions
 Dominoes
 Stepping
 Canework

Music 
Boogaloo relies on the swing and groove of live funk records, and the Boogaloo dance era corresponds with pre-drum machine preference for live drums. Below are notable songs Boogaloo dancers dance to:
 James Brown "Cold Sweat" Pt. 1 & 2
 James Brown “There Was a Time”
 James Brown "Soul Power"
 James Brown "Mind Power"
 Average White Band "Pick up the Pieces"
 Parliament & Funkadelic "Flashlight"
 George Duke "Reach for It"
 Cameo "Rigor Mortis"
 Donald Byrd and the Blackbyrds "Unfinished Business"

Impact

Connections to Strutting 
In 1975, Oakland dancers Donald Jones of the Boogaloo group Robotroids performed at a talent show in San Francisco. Eventually the Robotroids would join Debrah "Granny" Johnson. Through the combination of robotic dance moves of Lorenzo "Tony" Johnson and Donald Jones' Boogaloo, they would refer to this style as Strutting in San Francisco. Strutting was done in a solo through swift arm angles (The Fillmore) and through group choreography. Boogaloo Dancers such as Benjamin James from Live, Inc. were also instrumental in the evolution of Boogaloo to Strutting.

Connections to Richmond Robot 

Oakland Boogaloo groups as well as prominent San Francisco, San Jose dancers would compete in talent shows held in Richmond, California; this would be a cultural center for regional dance influences, by the late 1970s Richmond would be an epicenter of performers such as the Posing Puppets, Richmond Robots, Androids, Audionauts, Criminons, Lady Mechanical Robots and Green Machine. Groups from Richmond would refer to their style as Richmond Robottin.

Connection to Turfing 

The 60s and 70s Boogaloo generations have similar storytelling, animated movements and share the same neighborhoods and families with today's Turf dancers who practice a street style Turfing. Turf dancers cite inspiration from the previous generations of Boogaloo; they come from a long lineage of dancers in the Bay Area, specifically from Oakland, California.

Impact on Popping 

Popping would be eventually adapted from earlier Boogaloo movements to influence dancers in Fresno, California, in the late 1970s by way of California high-school gatherings of track & meet events called the West Coast Relays. Often, the best boogaloo dancers in Oakland would be chosen as high school mascots: all of the surrounding high school mascots would compete against other with a live school band during the half-time show.

Original Boogaloo Reunion BBQ 
An annual event held in Oakland honors contributions of the Boogaloo generation and hosts an intergenerational event for dancers in the Popping and Hiphop community to meet the original Boogaloo generation. Many Bay Area styles represented through Boogaloo, Robot, and Strutting are also showcased through different dancers at this event.

Media exposure

Television 
 1976: "Soul Is" & "The Jay Payton Show" - The Boogaloo group - The Black Resurgents were frequent dancers on a local syndicated dance Oakland show, displaying solo and group routines.
Granny & the Robotroids were one of the first Boogaloo groups to be seen on national TV performing on Chuck Barris' Gong Show in 1976.
 1977 & 1978: The Black Messengers, as Mechanical Device, performed on the Gong Show and displayed their style of "Posing Hard" the group choreography also includes of "Domino" steps, creeping, canework, and the famous M&M routine choreographed by Chuck Powell. Kerney Mayers also displays a signature solo with vibrating and trembling techniques. The Black Messengers were declared Gong Show winners on both occasions.
 1991: MC Hammer, a popular rapper from Oakland who grew up watching the Boogaloo group the Black Resurgents, includes Boogaloo choreography and fashion in his music video "This is The Way We Roll". The music video also features a Boogaloo dancer "Frosty".

Notable boogaloo dancers

1966 to 1969 era
 Albert Milton aka "Iron Man"
 Jerry Rentie "The Worm"
 Michael Enoch "The Mad"
 Larry Thompson "Pirate"
 Cornell "Tony Rome" Reese,
 Wayne "Freddy Snow" Dillard
 Levi Warner
 Danny Boy Reese
 Donald Mathews "Duck"
 Patricia Scott
 Red (Patricia Scott's brother)
 Henry Fischer
 Gregory Holm

1970 to 1975 era
 Steve Williams
 Ted Williams
 Kerney Mayers
 Chuck Powell
 John Murphy
 Jorey "Monk" Walker
 Michael Carter 
 Randy Pennington
 William Bilal "Boogaloo Bill"
 Noah Johnson
 Gaston Ducote
 Ricky Gantt
 Lil Ricky
 Ronald Nerves
 Paul Reid
 Amelia
 Tony Newsome
 Kenny Chambers
 Derrick Lovings
 Anthony Hamilton
 Darryl Hamilton "Hamo"
 Newberry
 Rosie
 Will Randolph III
 Vic Randolph
 Larry Robertson
 Ted Wincher
 Ben James

1976 to 1980s era

 Dan Hodges "Boogaloo Dan"
 Andrew "PopDog" Paris
 Ben James
 Dan "Boo the Bot" Martin
 Boogaloo Vic
 Boogaloo Dana
 Pierre Hudson
 Chris James 
 Darrin Hodges "Dubb"
 Reo Robot
 Dennis "Mechanical Man" Newsome
 Walter "Sundance" Freeman

References

External links 
 The Oakland Boogaloo Conservatory
 A little dance history: Popping, Boogaloo, Robot, Strutting, Fillmore, Etc.
 KQED Feature: SF & Oakland Hiphop Histories Come Alive in this Dance Demo

Popping (dance)
Syllabus-free dance
Social dance
Folk dance
African-American Diaspora
African-American dance
African-American cultural history
Performance art
Oakland, California